The following is the complete list of films produced and distributed by the American film studio The Weinstein Company. The company was founded by Bob and Harvey Weinstein in 2005. The company's first release in 2005 was the crime thriller film Derailed (starring Jennifer Aniston, Vincent Cassel, and Clive Owen). In March 2018, the company declared bankruptcy. In July 2018, the rights to its films were acquired by Lantern Entertainment. In 2019, Spyglass Media Group acquired the catalogue of Lantern Entertainment, with distribution handled by Lionsgate.

2000s

2010s

TV series

RADiUS-TWC

See also
 List of The Weinstein Company animated films

References 

Weinstein Company